The 2010 Liga Indonesia Premier Division Final was a football match which was played on Saturday, 29 May 2010. Persibo and Deltras was a debutant of the final stage.

Road to Solo

Match details

See also
2009–10 Liga Indonesia Premier Division

References

External links
Liga Indonesia Premier Division standings

2009-10